Kung Food is a video game developed for the Atari Lynx handheld by Christian Urqhart and Steven Mitchell and published by Atari Corporation in 1992. The player controls a protagonist who uses martial arts to overcome mutant vegetables that have invaded his freezer. Earlier in his career, Urquhart authored a number of ZX Spectrum games.

Gameplay

Plot

The main character has stored a top secret chemical in his kitchen freezer which he left open. This result was a mutation bringing all forms of foods to life and turned you into a little green man. You then have to destroy all foods, make your way to the garden where there is a sprinkler system where you can wash off the contaminants to restore your human form.

Development and release

Reception 

On July 7, 1999, Robert A. Jung reviewed Kung Food for IGN in his final verdict he wrote "Take away the story, and Kung Food comes across as a very average fighting game that breaks no new ground. The game's controls and minor quirks may irritate some players, but fight fans with Lynxes should look past the silliness and give the title a try." Rating the game 6 out of 10. In 2011, Winston Wolf reviewed the game for HonestGamers, giving it a rating of 3 out of 10.

References

External links 
 Kung Food at AtariAge
 Kung Food at GameFAQs
 Kung Food at Giant Bomb
 Kung Food at MobyGames

1992 video games
Atari Lynx games
Atari Lynx-only games
Beat 'em ups
Lore Design Limited games
Martial arts video games
Video games about food and drink
Video games developed in the United Kingdom